This is a list of people executed in Georgia. Since 1976, a total of 76 people have been executed by the state of Georgia in the United States.

List of people executed in Georgia since 1976

Summary of executions 
 Sex
 Male: 75 (99%)
 Female: 1 (1%)
 Method
 Electrocution: 23 (30%)
 Lethal injection: 53 (70%)

Record number of executions 
In 2016, the State of Georgia executed nine people. This set a record for the most executions conducted in Georgia in a calendar year. The same year, Texas only executed seven people, the first time it did not lead the nation in executions since 2001 (when it ranked behind Oklahoma). Prior to this, the most executions conducted in the state were five executions. This happened in 1987 and again in 2015.

Prior to 1976 
 Lena Baker was an African American maid who was executed on March 5, 1945, for killing her employer. In 2005, the Georgia State Board of Pardons and Paroles granted a pardon saying a verdict of manslaughter would have been more appropriate.
 The first individual electrocuted for a crime and sentenced to death (in Georgia) was Howard Henson, a black male, for rape and robbery; by electrocution on September 13, 1924, in DeKalb County. (See http://genealogytrails.com/geo/executions3.html through http://genealogytrails.com/geo/executions5.html.)

See also 
 Capital punishment in Georgia (U.S. state)
 Capital punishment in the United States
 Furman v. Georgia, the 1972 United States Supreme Court case that led to a de facto moratorium on capital punishment throughout the United States; the moratorium came to an end when Gregg v. Georgia was decided in 1976
 Gregg v. Georgia, the 1976 United States Supreme Court decision ending the de facto moratorium on the death penalty imposed by the Court in its 1972 decision Furman v. Georgia
 List of death row inmates in Georgia
 List of most recent executions by jurisdiction
 List of people executed in the United States in 2015
 List of people executed in the United States in 2016
 List of women executed in the United States since 1976

Notes 


References 

Execution
Legal history of Georgia (U.S. state)
Georgia
 List